Novo Sarajevo (lit. "New Sarajevo") is a municipality of the city of Sarajevo, Bosnia and Herzegovina.

Neighborhoods
Grbavica I
Grbavica II
Pofalići I
Pofalići II
Velešići
Gornji Velešići
Željeznička
Dolac Malta
Čengić Vila I
Kvadrant
Čengić Vila II
Hrasno
Hrasno Brdo
Trg Heroja
Kovačići
Gornji Kovačići
Vraca

History
Like Novi Grad, Novo Sarajevo is a product of the city's massive growth and development in the 1960s and 1970s. It is located in the middle of the Sarajevo field, predominantly on the northern bank of the Miljacka, between Novi Grad and Centar.

Prior to the siege, Novo Sarajevo had some 47.6 km² (41.6% Forest, 17.5% Meadows, 13.5% Commercial/Building Land, 10.4% Grass-land, 8.4% Ploghland, 13.5% Gardens). Following the siege of Sarajevo, 75% of the lesser populated urban area was transferred to Republika Srpska (established as  Istočno Novo Sarajevo), leaving Novo Sarajevo municipality with 11.43 km². As a result, Novo Sarajevo has the highest number of people per km², some 7524.

Economy
Novo Sarajevo is known as something of the commercial and business center of Sarajevo, housing many of the city's major companies and corporations such as Elektroprivreda Bosne i Hercegovine, the University of Sarajevo, UN house Bosnia and Herzegovina and also the HQ of Sparkasse Bank and the Raiffeisen Bank in Bosnia and Herzegovina.

Novo Sarajevo is considered to be the second most developed municipality in the Federation of Bosnia and Herzegovina, boasting a per capita GDP of some 11,000 USD (275.2% of FBiH average GDP), just behind the municipality of Centar, Sarajevo. These two municipalities combine for 60.9% of the Sarajevo Canton GDP, even though they account for merely 3.5% of the total area of Sarajevo Canton, and 27% of its population.

Sites of interests
Historical Museum of Bosnia and Herzegovina (Historijski Muzej Bosne i Hercegovine)
Vilsonovo Šetalište – popular promenade and recreation area (Wilson's Promenade) 
Suada and Olga bridge – bridge is a monument to Suada Dilberović and Olga Sučić, the first victims shot at the beginning of the siege of Sarajevo.
Church of the Holy Transfiguration
Hum Tower – park and recreational zone
Grbavica Stadium – (Stadium of FK Željezničar)
University of Sarajevo Campus
ROBOT Shopping Centar Novo Sarajevo
Konzum Family Centar  Sarajevo (ex. Mercator)
Embassy of the United States, Sarajevo
Old Jewish Cemetery, Sarajevo

Demographics

1971
111,811 total
Serbs – 45,806 (40.96%)
Bosniaks – 37,147 (33.22%)
Croats – 17,491 (15.64%)
Yugoslavs – 5,798 (5.18%)
Others – 5,569 (5.00%)

1991
95,089 total
Bosniaks – 33,902 (35.7%)
Serbs – 32,899 (34.6%)
Yugoslavs – 15,580 (16.4%)
Croats – 8,798 (9.3%)
Others – 4,391 (4.6%)

2013
64,814 total
Bosniaks – 48,188 (74.34%)
Croats – 4,639 (7.15%)
Serbs – 3,402 (5.24%)
Others – 8,585 (13.24%)

References

External links

The official web site of Novo Sarajevo municipality

 
Populated places in the Sarajevo Canton